Leslie Mortier Shaw (November 2, 1848March 28, 1932) was an American businessman, lawyer, and politician. He served as the 17th Governor of Iowa and was a Republican candidate in the 1908 United States presidential election.

Biography
Shaw was born in Morristown, Vermont, the son of Boardman O. Shaw and Louise Spaulding "Lovisa" Shaw.  He attended Cornell College in 1874.  Shaw married the former Alice Crenshaw on December 6, 1877, with whom he had three children.

He became a lawyer and banker, and, in 1898, became the 17th Governor of Iowa, serving until 1902. He then became the U.S. Secretary of the Treasury under President Theodore Roosevelt from 1902 to 1907.

Like his predecessor Secretary Lyman Gage, Shaw firmly believed that the Treasury should serve the money market in times of difficulty through the introduction of Treasury funds. To this end, Shaw bought back the government bonds from commercial banks that owned them, increased the number of government depository banks, and in 1902, he told the banks that they no longer needed to keep cash reserves against their holdings of public funds.  The intended effect of these actions was to provide a more elastic currency which would then respond to the needs of the market. The government intervention in the money market reached its height with Shaw. He supported tariff theory according to the New York Times.

He resigned on March 3, 1907, to become a banker in New York City. He was a candidate for the Republican Party nomination during the U.S. presidential election in 1908.

After leaving the Presidential Cabinet and his public life, he returned to banking, working in New York City. Shaw died in Washington, D.C., and was buried in Oakland Cemetery in Denison, Iowa.

Footnotes

Further reading

External links

 U.S. Department of the Treasury biography
 Men of Mark in America
 

|-

|-

1848 births
1932 deaths
19th-century American politicians
20th-century American politicians
Cornell College alumni
Republican Party governors of Iowa
People from Morristown, Vermont
Candidates in the 1908 United States presidential election
United States Secretaries of the Treasury
Theodore Roosevelt administration cabinet members
People from Denison, Iowa
Burials in Iowa